Brindaban Goswami was a leader of Asom Gana Parishad and former Education Minister in Government of Assam. He was one of the student leaders who came into limelight during Assam Agitation. He was member of split group of Asom Gana Parishad known as Natun Asom Gana Parishad when it was formed due to Prafulla Kumar Mahanta. He was also President of Asom Gana Parishad for brief period of time.

During Assam Legislative Assembly election in 2006, Goswami was named as chief ministerial candidate of Asom Gana Parishad. He is also five times Member of Legislative Assembly from Tezpur constituency.

References 

1957 births
Living people
Assam MLAs 1985–1991
Assam MLAs 1996–2001
Assam MLAs 2001–2006
Assam MLAs 2016–2021
Asom Gana Parishad politicians
State cabinet ministers of Assam
Place of birth missing (living people)